The Madman, His Parables and Poems is a book written by Kahlil Gibran, which was published in the United States by Alfred A. Knopf in 1918, with illustrations reproduced from original drawings by the author. It was Gibran's first book in English to be published, also marking the beginning of the second phase of Gibran's career. May Ziadeh, with whom Gibran had been corresponding since 1912, reviewed it in Al-Hilal, a magazine in Egypt.

References

External links
 The Madman at Standard Ebooks

1918 books
Books by Kahlil Gibran